Sound Proof is the eighth studio album by guitarist Greg Howe, released on June 24, 2008 through Tone Center Records.

Critical reception

Glenn Astarita at All About Jazz gave Sound Proof a positive review, calling it "Howe's finest musical statement to date" and praising the technical craft of each musician. He listed "Sunset in El Paso", "Child's Play" and Howe's cover of "Tell Me Something Good" by Stevie Wonder as highlights.

Greg Prato at AllMusic gave the album 3.5 stars out of 5, saying that "Musical trends may come and go, but you always know what's in store with a new Greg Howe release, and this veteran shredder certainly doesn't disappoint with Sound Proof." Praise was given to Howe's playing, which was described as sounding like Steve Vai on "Morning View", as well as other highlights "Emergency Exit" and "Side Note". Prato concluded by recommending Sound Proof to fans of "all-instrumental prog metal with guitar at the forefront".

Track listing

Personnel
Greg Howe – guitar, spoken vocals (track 11), production
David Cook – keyboard
Dennis Hamm – keyboard solo (track 9)
Gianluca Palmieri – drums
Jon Reshard – bass
Elvio Fernandez – spoken vocals (track 1, 11)
Dale Fischer – spoken vocals (tracks 4, 14)
Greg Wiktorski – engineering
Jason D'Ottavio – mixing
Ashley Moore – mastering

References

External links
In Review: Greg Howe "Sound Proof" at Guitar Nine Records
Review: Greg Howe - Sound Proof at The Guitar Channel

Greg Howe albums
2008 albums
Tone Center Records albums
Albums recorded in a home studio